P. nanus may refer to:
 Philautus nanus, an extinct frog species endemic to Sri Lanka
 Phrynobatrachus nanus, a frog species found in Chad and possibly Central African Republic
 Phrynopus nanus, a frog species endemic to Colombia
 Physalaemus nanus, a frog species endemic to Brazil
 Pleurocoelus nanus, a dinosaur species from the Early Cretaceous found in North America
 Pseudomys nanus, the western chestnut mouse, a rodent species found only in Australia
 Pyrgulopsis nanus, the distal-gland springsnail, a freshwater snail species

See also
 Nanus (disambiguation)